WQAM (560 AM, "AM 560 Sports") is a radio station in Miami, Florida. Owned by Audacy, Inc., it broadcasts a sports talk format carrying a mixture of local and CBS Sports Radio programming. Studios are located in Audacy's Miami office on Northeast Second Avenue, and the transmitter site is in the Little River neighborhood of Miami at 360 Northeast 71st Street.

Origin

WQAM is one of Florida's oldest radio stations. According to Federal Communications Commission (FCC) records, the station was first licensed on January 23, 1923, corresponding with the first license issued with the WQAM call letters. However, multiple alternative dates have been stated for its founding, due to the opinion that WQAM's history should actually start with an earlier Miami station, WFAW. Moreover, although government records state that WFAW was licensed to The Miami Daily Metropolis from June 16, 1922 until its deletion on June 11, 1923, Fred W. Borton later claimed that WFAW had actually been first licensed to him, although there are no records supporting the existence of WFAW prior to the initial Metropolis grant.

In addition to its possible link to WQAM, WFAW's origin date in turn has been variously reported to actually be from 1920 to 1922, including:

 "WFAW, forerunner of WQAM, began operations with a 50 w transmitter in 1920".
"The 50-watt transmitter that Mr. Borton put together out of odds and ends in 1920 was licensed for operation the following year. Its first call letters, WFAW, were changed to WQAM a year later."
"It was in 1920, while a co-owner of the Electrical Equipment Co., that Borton cranked up the transmitter of Florida's first radio station, WFAW, the forerunner of WQAM... The call letters were changed to WQAM in 1922..."
"Radio station WQAM was the first broadcasting station to be established in Florida. The license, issued to it by the department of commerce, to Fred W. Borton, was dated February, 1921, with the call letters WFAW. The original call letters were discontinued in 1922, and the new letters, WQAM, now in use, were adopted."
May 1921 is listed as the WQAM start date in the 1972 edition of the Broadcasting Yearbook.
""Founded in 1922 as the pioneer broadcaster in Florida, and still the southernmost station in the United States, WQAM..."

History

On December 9, 1922, the Miami Metropolis announced that broadcasts over its station, WFAW, were being suspended, pending a move to a new Electrical Equipment Company location, with the existing WFAW transmiter to be dismantled. On January 27, 1923, the Metropolis reported that a 100 watt transmitter to be used by the newspaper's broadcast service, that was designed and built by F. W. Borton of the Electrical Equipment Company and installed at Electrical Equipment's offices at Northwest Fourth Street, would make its debut broadcast the next evening. Two days later, the newspaper wrote: "With the completion of the enlarged radio plant of The Miami Daily Metropolis and Electrical Equipment Company, The Metropolis announces that the government has granted a new charter and also changed the station number to (WQAM). The station number until today was (WFAW)." However, WQAM was licensed to the Electrical Equipment Company, and WFAW to the Miami Daily Metropolis, and government regulators at the time considered them to be separate stations, so the two are reported individually in a March 1, 1923 government listing of active licenses. Thus, the FCC History Cards documenting WQAM's records list January 23, 1923 as its "Date First Licensed", corresponding with the first license issued with the WQAM call letters.

The president of the Electrical Equipment Company was W. W. Luce. WQAM was initially  licensed for operation on the 360 meter (833 kHz) "entertainment" wavelength. The call letters were randomly assigned from a sequential roster of available call signs.

Fred W. Borton, who became president of the Miami Broadcasting Company, made many of the electrical parts himself. In 1926, the station increased its power to 500 watts. The station was the first in the United States to install a permanent remote pick-up from the U. S. Meteorological Department. Power was increased to 1,000 watts in 1928, and WQAM became a full-time affiliate of CBS. In 1947, it switched to ABC Radio. In 1948, Barton sold his interest in the station and The Miami Herald assumed entire ownership.

In the beginning, the young station was helped with programming by the newspaper, until the paper ended its participation.

WQAM is famous for its ownership by Storz Broadcasting in the 1960s, when it presented a Top 40 format and competed vigorously with rival WFUN (at 790 AM). In February 1964, the station interviewed and heavily promoted The Beatles' second and third nationally televised appearances on CBS's The Ed Sullivan Show live from the Deauville Hotel in North Beach, Miami Beach.

By far Miami and South Florida's preeminent radio station at the time, baby boomers from Jupiter to Key West, and down to Havana, listened to WQAM for the latest in local and American pop music from the 1960s well into the late 1970s. At that time, WQAM was one of the many AM radio stations airing Casey Kasem's American Top 40, and Cuban youngsters used to gather at friends’ houses to listen to the countdown of America's most popular songs, especially the 8-hour-long year-end show of Billboard's top 100 songs of the year in which the syndication company that owned the show had put out on vinyl records at a speed of 33 RPM.

On February 29, 1980, Sunshine Wireless bought the station. WQAM had been a long-time Top 40 station. After many years as a contemporary music station and heavy competition from FM competitors forced the station to switch to a country music format, and was known as Sun Country WQAM but not after running a montage of music, soundbites, and Jingles from PAMS from its Top 40 days. Sunshine Wireless now had an AM country station, with personality DJs, NBC News, and local information. WQAM was known as "56 Country WQAM" in the mid 80's and was successful in the ratings under the direction of program director Jon Holiday. WQAM had many veteran DJ's for the country format like Mike Bell, Mitch Lewis, Johnny Dolan, Boomer, and George Sheldon- who had his start in radio at WQAM in 1986, WQAM shared studios with then-WKQS at 9881 Sheridan Street in Cooper City. In 1986, WQAM would add sports talk programming in the evening hours with Ed Kaplan.

By 1989, WQAM had been unable to achieve a full share point in the Arbitron surveys with its mix of country music and sports. In 1990, the station abandoned its country music format in favor of the satellite-fed "Kool Gold" service, which aired '50s and '60s music.

Around 1992, WQAM became an all-sports station. Currently, WQAM is the flagship station for the Miami Dolphins, Florida Panthers, and University of Miami Hurricanes.

WQAM used to be a Yahoo! Sports Radio affiliate. On January 2, 2013, the station switched to CBS Sports Radio for after-hours programming.

CBS Radio/Audacy ownership 
On October 2, 2014, Beasley Broadcast Group announced that it would trade 5 radio stations located in Miami (including WQAM) and Philadelphia to CBS Radio in exchange for 14 stations located in Tampa, Charlotte and Philadelphia. The swap was completed on December 1, 2014.

On December 23, 2015, WQAM was granted a construction permit to move approximately 10 miles (16 km) north from Virginia Key to the [1360+1450] transmitter site at 360 NE 71st Street in Little River (Miami) and decrease day power to 4,100 watts.

On February 2, 2017, CBS Radio announced it would merge with Entercom (now Audacy, Inc.). The merger was approved on November 9, 2017, and was consummated on November 17, making WQAM a sister station to fellow sports station WAXY.

On August 2, 2019, Entercom announced that WQAM would re-launch as 560 The Joe on August 5, as part of a re-alignment of its sports talk lineups. WAXY's ESPN Radio affiliation was swapped to WQAM, clearing The Dan Le Batard Show with Stugotz (as its new flagship station), Stephen A. Smith, and the network's overnight and weekend programming (notwithstanding conflicts with sports play-by-play). In turn, some of WQAM's local hosts were moved to WAXY's lineup, while Marc Hochman and Channing Crowder's afternoon program would be simulcast by both stations (but with an opening hour exclusive to WAXY).

As part of a larger realignment of ESPN Radio's schedule on August 17, 2020 (which saw Dan Le Batard cut to two hours, and the premiere of Greeny with Mike Greenberg), WQAM began to simulcast Hochman and Crowder from WAXY in full.

On October 26, 2021, Audacy realigned WQAM and WAXY's programming once again; WQAM rebranded as 560 Sports and took on a CBS Sports Radio affiliation and WAXY's local programming (with the first hour of Hochman and Crowder now exclusive to WQAM), while WAXY replaced much of its local programming with sports betting-oriented shows from Audacy's BetQL network.

Former sports and talk show hosts
Hank Goldberg – The Hammer host
Jim Mandich – The Mad Dog' host
Sid Rosenberg – host
Jon Sciambi – now at ESPN.
Scott Ferrall – now at SportsGrid
Michael Irvin – "The Playmaker" host; now an analyst at NFL Network
Neil Rogers

Sports properties
Miami Dolphins (1997–2004, 2007–2009, 2016-2023; the 2016 tenure was co-held with WKIS)
Miami Heat (1988–1993, 2022-present)
Miami Marlins (1993–2007, was on 790 WAXY/104.3 WAXY-FM, but is now on 940 WINZ as of November 6, 2013 )
Florida Panthers (1993–2007, 2010–present)
University of Miami Hurricanes (1999–present)

References

Bibliography

 Hollingsworth, Tracy. History of Dade County Florida''. Coral Gables, FL: Glade House, 1949.

External links
 
 
FCC History Cards for WQAM (covering 1923-1979)
Rick Shaw Remembers WQAM Tiger Radio (South Florida Radio History article by Rick Shaw)
WQAM Tribute Site

QAM
Sports radio stations in the United States
Radio stations established in 1923
1923 establishments in Florida
Audacy, Inc. radio stations